Nadja Becker (born 25 October 1978) is a German actress.

Filmography 

2004–2007: Stromberg as Maja
2007: Warum Männer nicht zuhören und Frauen schlecht einparken as Angie Luschmund
2008: SOKO: Wismar as Cindy Poguntke
2008: Polizeiruf 110 as Corinna
2008: Hallo Robbie! as Dora Beier
2009: Tatort as Rieka Cordes
2009: Ein Fall für zwei as Julia Bartsch
2009: Ein starkes Team as Evelyn Machnow
2010: The Whore as Hiltrud
2010–2014: Danni Lowinski as Bea Flohe
2016:  as Friedl Strasser-Dassler

External links 
 
Official website 

1978 births
German film actresses
German stage actresses
German television actresses
Living people
People from Siegen
21st-century German actresses